Juraj Škarpa (29 November 1881 – 31 December 1952) was a Croatian sculptor. His work was part of the sculpture event in the art competition at the 1924 Summer Olympics.

References

Further reading
 Antun Bauer, 1943: Portreti hrvatskih umjetnika - Juraj Škarpa, Hrvatski krugoval 42, Zagreb, 28 November 1943
 Grgo Gamulin, 1999: Hrvatsko kiparstvo XIX. i XX. stoljeća, Zagreb, pp. 137-138
 Ljerka Gašparović, Božena Kličković and Vinko Zlamalik, 1988: Juraj Škarpa, katalog izložbe u Gliptoteci JAZU, Zagreb
 Vinko Srhoj, 2004: Juraj Škarpa, Stari Grad,

External links
 Vinko Srhoj: Ekspresionistička dionica Jurja Škarpe, Rad. Inst. povij. umjet. 31/2007 (online version)
 Vinko Srhoj: Slavni majstori i nevidljivi pomagači: Meštrović i suradnici na mauzoleju obitelji Račić u Cavtatu (online version)

1881 births
1952 deaths
19th-century Croatian sculptors
20th-century Croatian sculptors
Croatian sculptors
Olympic competitors in art competitions
People from Stari Grad, Croatia
Burials at Mirogoj Cemetery